Greatest Hits: Shining Like a National Guitar is the fifth greatest hits album by American singer-songwriter Paul Simon, which was released on May 23, 2000 by the Warner Music Group. This is his fifth compilation so far. This album was also directed by Antonio Luis. Although the album was a chart success across Europe, it was not issued in the United States and continues to be an expensive import. The title of the album is taken from the first two lines of the song "Graceland," which is also the first track on the album.

Reception

This album received generally positive reviews. AllMusic gave it 4.5 out of a possible 5 stars, calling it "by far the best [Paul Simon] collection ever released."

Track listing

Certifications

References

2000 greatest hits albums
Paul Simon compilation albums